Nicolas van Ditmar (born 30 September 1965) is an Argentine alpine skier. He competed in three events at the 1984 Winter Olympics.

References

External links
 

1965 births
Living people
Argentine male alpine skiers
Olympic alpine skiers of Argentina
Alpine skiers at the 1984 Winter Olympics
Skiers from Buenos Aires